The year 1577 in science and technology included many events, some of which are listed here.

Astronomy
 The Constantinople Observatory of Taqi ad-Din is completed.
 The Great Comet of 1577 is seen. Tycho Brahe is able to discover from his observations that comets and similar objects travel above the Earth's atmosphere.

Mechanics
 Guidobaldo del Monte, Marchese del Monte, publishes Mechanicorum Liber in Pisa.

Medicine
 Publication of John Frampton's , an English translated from Nicolás Monardes' Historia medicinal de las cosas que se traen de nuestras Indias Occidentales (1565).

Technology
 English race-built galleon Revenge launched at the Royal Dockyard, Deptford, by Master Shipwright Mathew Baker.

Births
 October 3 – Fortunio Liceti, Italian Aristotelian scientific polymath (died 1657)

Deaths
 Pietro Andrea Mattioli, Italian physician and botanist (born 1501)
 Adam von Bodenstein, Swiss alchemist and physician (born 1528)

References

 
16th century in science
1570s in science